Smashing the Spy Ring is a 1938 American drama film, directed by Christy Cabanne. It stars Ralph Bellamy, Fay Wray, and Regis Toomey, and was released on December 29, 1938.

Plot 
Undercover secret agents John Baxter and Ted Hall apprehend a foreign spy at a factory, but he is shot by Steve Corben. They are transferred to Washington D.C. to work with Phil Dunlap to break up a spy ring, but Phil is quickly killed. Phil's sister Eleanor agrees to help finish the work. During the testing of a new chemical weapon, Ted fakes his death while John impersonates the gas's inventor Professor Leonard and feigns a mental breakdown. John and Eleanor, who pretends to be Leonard's sisters, admit themselves into the spy ring's sanatorium to gather intelligence but are discovered and captured. They escape by throwing acid from the laboratory at their captors before the D.C. Metropolitan Police Department surrounds the building. John and Eleanor become engaged, and Ted begins writing a novel based on the adventure.

Cast list
 Ralph Bellamy as John Baxter
 Fay Wray as Eleanor Dunlap
 Regis Toomey as Ted Hall
 Walter Kingsford as Dr. L. B. Carter
 Ann Doran as Madelon Martin
 Warren Hull as Phil Dunlap
 Forbes Murray as Colonel Scully
 Adrian Booth as Miss Loring (credited as Lorna Gray)
 Paul Whitney as Mason
 Bess Flowers as Mrs. Austin
 John Tyrrell as Johnson

References

External links 
 
 
 

1938 drama films
1938 films
American drama films
Films directed by Christy Cabanne
Columbia Pictures films
American black-and-white films
Films about chemical war and weapons
Films set in Washington, D.C.
1930s American films